Jewelry of the Swedish Royal Family is the set of ceremonial jewels been owned by members of the Swedish royal family or by the Bernadotte family foundations. The Swedish national regalia, which have a symbolic meaning and are not to be regarded as jewelry, are, on the other hand, owned by the Swedish state.

The jewelry is officially worn on occasions such as state visits, the Nobel banquet, annual royal dinners at Stockholm Castle and various weddings. Queen Silvia wore one of the royal jewelry (Princess Sibylla's tiara) for the first time the night before her wedding in 1976. Crown Princess Victoria and Princess Madeleine wore a tiara for the first time in the year they turned 18. In 2015, Sofia Hellqvist wore a tiara for the first time the day when she married Prince Carl Philip.

The jewelry is taken care of by court jeweler W.A. Bolin that cleans and repairs them.

Until 1974, the royals and court ladies wore tiaras at the opening of the Swedish Parliament.

History 
Several of the jewelry originates from Napoleon I's first wife Joséphine de Beauharnais who was the grandmother of the Swedish queen Josefina of Leuchtenberg. Victoria of Baden has increased the Swedish collection as well as Crown Princess Margaret of Sweden.

Karl XIV Johan created a jewelry fideicommissum that would be at the Queen's disposal, so that the collection could be increased but never decreased. This meant that the jewelry that once belonged to the collection could not be given away. At the end of the 19th century, Oscar II transformed the jewelry fideicommissum into a foundation, which is now part of the Bernadotte family foundations as well as a foundation created by Gustaf V and Queen Victoria. These pieces do not belong to the Swedish royals privately, but the family can borrow them from the foundation to wear them.

The jewelry of the Bernadotte Family Foundations was exhibited once in 1976–1977 in connection with the wedding between Carl XVI Gustaf and Queen Silvia.

Parures 
Parure is a term for a set of jewelry with a common shape and decor. It can include tiara, necklace, earrings, two bracelets and brooch. A smaller set consists of fewer parts and can be called demi-parure. The Swedish royal family's jewelry collection contains both historical and modern Parures.

Joséphine de Beauharnais Cameo Parure 
The so-called cameo set consists of a tiara, necklace, earrings, brooch and two bracelets. The set is made of several materials such as gold, pearls, diamonds and large cameos. It was a gift from Emperor Napoleon I to his wife Joséphine de Beauharnais around 1805. It was inherited by the Empress Joséphine's granddaughter, Josephine of Leuchtenberg, married to Oscar I. When Josephine died in 1876, she in bequeathed the entire cameo set to her only daughter, Princess Eugénie, who inherited the jewelry in 1889 to her nephew Prince Eugene. Princess Sibylla received them as a gift from Prince Eugene at her wedding to Gustaf Adolf in 1932. Sibylla left the jewelry to her only son (Carl XVI Gustaf) and they are today worn by Queen Silvia. The jewelry is not part of the Bernadotte family foundations.

Queen Ingrid of Denmark wore the parure at a ball in the 1930s, where she dressed as Josephine of Leuchtenberg. Queen Silvia has made a change to the necklace; she removed one of the four rows of pearls in it. When Queen Silvia wears the cameo set, she usually does not mix it with any other jewelry.

Weddings 
The tiara was worn by Silvia Sommerlath at her wedding on 19 June 1976. It has also been worn by Princess Birgitta and Princess Désirée at their respective weddings. In 2010, Crown Princess Victoria also wore the Comeo tiara with earrings and one bracelet at her wedding with Daniel Westling.

Leuchtenberg Sapphire Parure 
Josephine of Leuchtenberg inherited the jewelry from her mother Augusta Amalia, Duchess of Leuchtenberg. The set was probably created by Marie-Etienne Nitot in Paris. The jewelry went to Sofia of Nassau, but it is not documented that she wore the parure. Furthermore,  Victoria of Baden became the last to own them privately. After her death in 1930, they were incorporated into the Bernadotte family foundations.

The Leuchtenberg sapphire set consists of a tiara, necklace, earrings, brooch and hairpins. The tiara is divided into eleven parts to get a flexible shape. The diadem can be worn in a wide, more open shape on the head or in a circular shape. On a portrait of Josephine of Leuchtenberg there is a version of the tiara with pearls. When the diadem was examined in 2006, it was found that the sapphires can be removed and replaced with pearls. The earrings that today belong to the parure are not original. These disappeared during Victorias time and after her death Louise Mountbatten  had new sapphire earrings ordered from two of the four hairpins in the set.

The parure was later worn by Louise Mountbatten, Princess Sibylla of Saxe-Coburg and Gotha, and on one occasion, at the current royal couple's wedding in 1976, Princess Birgitta wore the Leuchtenberg parure. The sapphires today are worn only by Queen Silvia and she does not usually mix with any other jewelry.  She wore the tiara at her second child, Prince Carl Philips wedding in 2015.

Cut-steel parure 

The cut-steel parure is not made of precious stones but of steel and gilded brass. There is an necklace which Queen Silvia has only worn it on two occasions. It is said that Queen Silvia found the jewelry hidden in an old cupboard in the castle. The first document wearing of the diadem is photos of Queen Silvia during the 1979 Austrian state visit. Today it is worn by Crown Princess Victoria but also by Princess Christina and Queen Silvia on occasion. Princess Lilian wore the tiara on one occasion, the Nobel Banquet in 1984. In English, the tiara is called the "Napoleonic Cut-Steel Tiara".

At Princess Madeleine's wedding in 2013, Princess Désirée wore the steel tiara.

Small cut-steel set 
This set consists of a tiara and a haircomb. According to an article in the Royal Magazine the two items are part of the cut-steel parure. The set has been worn by Crown Princess Victoria since October 2012  first worn at the wedding in Luxembourg. The steel diadem was worn for the first time by Princess Sofia in 2016 and Princess Christina in 2017.

Amethyst parure 
The Amethyst parure is a jewelry set made of amethysts, diamonds and gold. The set includes a tiara that was previously a necklace, two bracelets, earrings and two brooches. The first image of a Swedish royalty wearing the parure is of Louise Mountbatten. Queen Silvia was the first to wear the amethyst necklace as a tiara in the early 1980s.

Crown Princess Victoria wore the bracelets as a necklace for the first time at the millennium party at the Royal Palace. She wore the tiara during a state visit to Finland in 2000. Today it is worn by Queen Silvia and Crown Princess Victoria, but in recent years the king's sister Princess Désirée has borrowed the parure at the Crown Princess wedding. Today, the garrison belongs to the Bernadotte family foundations.

At the Nobel Banquet, Silvia has only worn the parure on one occasion, in 1986. She chose the amethysts to wear for the Danish Crown Prince's wedding in 2004. The parure was worn by Princess Madeleine for the first time at the Nobel Banquet on 10 December 2012. During the Canadian state visit to Sweden in February 2017, the tiara was worn by Princess Sofia.

Russian Pink Topaz Parure 
The parure consists of a necklace, brooch and a corsage made of brilliants and pink topazes that came to Sweden with Victoria of Baden. The jewelry has its origins in Russia, the three pieces of jewelry were first thought to have been ordered by Tsar Paul I. But he died in 1801, the jewelry was made about 10 years later. His wife, the widowed Empress Maria Fyodorovna, ordered them for her daughter Maria Pavlovna as a gift when she gave birth to her daughter Augusta in 1811. Augusta in turn received the jewelry as an inheritance or gift in 1829 when she married the future emperor Wilhelm I of Germany.

The imperial couple's daughter Louise married Fredrik I of Baden in 1856 and the pink topazes parure then came to Karlsruhe. In 1923, the Queen of Sweden, Victoria, inherited her grandmother's jewelry.

Princess Sibylla lacked earrings for the set and had them arranged so that the two outer pendants of the corsage could be unhooked and also worn as earrings.

Louise Mountbatten, Princess Désirée and Princess Christina have all worn the parure.

Demi-parures

Grand Bernadotte pearl demi-parure 
The necklace today consists of 26 nut-sized, gray-toned oriental pearls with a brilliant clasp. Initially, there were 36 beads and three teardrop-shaped beads used as clasps for the necklace. It was Victoria of Baden who had the necklace shortened. Today there are also a pair of pearl drop earrings that match.

Queen Silvia wore the necklace and earrings on the Crown Princess' declaration of authority  on 14th of July 1995 and at her granddaughter Estelle's baptism at the Stockholm Palace church on 22 May 2012.

There are photos of Princess Sibylla wearing the necklace.

The Bernadotte Emerald demi-parure 
The jewelry was originally a belt of diamonds and emeralds. The large brooch that is today part of the demi-parure is from the beginning a buckle for the belt. Today, the necklace consists of 16 rosettes that were arranged for Princess Sibylla. It is documented that Queen Sofia wore the necklace.

Silvia has worn the larger brooch as a buckle during a state visit to Saudi Arabia, but then as a belt buckle for a silk ribbon. 

Silvia has seldom worn the emeralds at the Nobel banquet, but in 1987 she wore the necklace and the large brooch that held the Seraphim ribbon in place. 

At the Nobel Banquet in 2012, Crown Princess Victoria wore all parts of the emerald set for the first time. 

At the state visit from Germany 2021 Queen Silvia wore a pair of emerald earrings. The earrings are from the necklace which has been shortened.

Tiaras

Braganca diamond tiara 
In Swedish the tiara is called either Kröningsdiademet (The Coronation Diadem), or Brasilianska diademet (The Brazilian Diadem). Once belonged to the Empress Amalie of Brazil and as the only heir, her sister, Josephine of Leuchtenberg, inherited the jewelry in 1873. This tiara of brilliants weighs three kilos. 

Louise Mountbatten wore this tiara to the solemn opening of the Riksdag during her time as Queen. In the very first official photo, the new queen Silvia wore this tiara and has continued to do so in such photos. There are a few occasions when she wore the Leuchtenberg sapphire garnish on official portraits. 

Queen Silvia usually wears it during state visits from other monarchs or ceremonial gatherings. On one occasion she wore it abroad, during her state visit to Denmark in 2007. She wore the large tiara at the Crown Princess' wedding in 2010.

The Button tiaras 
There are two tiaras that are designed in the same way with diamond rosettes, the four-button tiara and the six-button tiara in Swedish called Karl Johan diademet. But the rosettes called buttons are not identical. In addition to these 10 diamond rosettes, there are two that can be used as pendants for necklaces.

4-button tiara 
The four-button tiaras rosettes are more reminiscent of a star design. The four diamond rosettes were transformed into a tiara for the Norwegian state visit in 1959; it was worn by Princess Margaretha at the gala dinner. The tiara have used by all Haga princesses. This tiara has never been used by Queen Silvia, but is used by her daughters. Crown Princess Victoria used the Four Button Diadem at the Nobel Banquet for the first time in 1997 and also for the Crown Prince of Denmark's wedding in 2004.  Princess Madeleine wore it for the first time during the Nobel Banquet in 2009.

It has also been used by Princess Sofia since 2016. Princess Lilian has worn the tiara at a few events.

6-button tiara 

The six buttons in the second tiara are designed more like flowers with small leaves. They can be traced to King Karl XIV Johan who had these diamond rosettes attached to Erik XIV's royal crown from 1560 before his coronation in 1818. During King Gustaf V's reign, the royal crown was restored, the diamond rosettes were removed and reworked into a necklace for Crown Princess Margareta.

Queen Victoria of Sweden began the work of creating a tiara, but it did not become a reality until the 1970s. The first to wear the tiara was Princess Lilian. The tiara was later used by Queen Silvia on one occasion, today it is used by Princesses Victoria, Madeleine, Christina and Sofia. There are now two rows of diamonds to hide the base of the tiara setting.

Crown Princess Victoria wore the 6-button tiara at the Nobel Banquet for the first time in 2007.

Princess Christina wore this tiara at Crown Princess Victoria's wedding in 2010. She also wore it at Princess Madeleine's wedding in 2013. 

Princess Sofia debuted with this tiara during the 80th Birthdays celebrations of King Harald and Queen Sonja of Norway in 2017.

Nine-prong tiara 
The tiara is called Drottning Sofias diadem (Queen Sofias tiara) in Swedish. The tiara came to Sweden with Sophia of Nassau. It is a diamond tiara used mostly by Queen Silvia. The fan-shaped diadem was originally believed to have been a jewel comb that was remade in the late 19th century. At one point it was worn by Princess Lilian, the Nobel Banquet in 1977. Princess Christina have also worn the tiara.

Princess Margaretha wore the tiara at her brother's wedding in 1976. At Crown Princess Victoria's wedding, it was worn by Princess Birgitta. Queen Silvia wore the tiara at The Crown Prince wedding in 2001 and Princess Madeleine's wedding in 2013.

Laurel wreath tiara 
Laurel wreath tiara called in Swedish Prinsessan Lilians Diadem (Princess Lilian's Tiara) was at the beginning a necklace that Princess Margaret of Great Britain and Ireland received from her husband's grandmother Sophia of Nassau. The jewelry was made by Boucheron in Paris. The material is silver, gold and diamonds. The design is reminiscent of a laurel wreath. Prince Bertil inherited it from his mother Margareta. As early as 1972, Lilian, then Craig, wore this tiara at King Gustaf VI Adolf's official 90th anniversary celebration, and later in 1976 at the king's and Silvia's wedding. Lilian never wore it as a necklace. Princess Lilian bequeathed the tiara to its current owner, Crown Princess Victoria. 

Crown Princess Victoria wore Princess Lilian's tiara when Princess Madeleine married in 2013.Victoria also wore the tiara at Emperor Naruhito's Enthronement Banquet 2019.

Connaught tiara 
In English called the Connaught tiara but in Sweden Prinsessan Sibyllas diadem (Princess Sibylla's tiara). The jewelry is made of diamonds and designed as five flower wreaths. In each wreath is a diamond clapper and between each wreath is a diamond rosette with a flower. Princess Sibylla's tiara can be converted into a necklace in the tiara's original shape or you can put the five brilliant clappers in a narrow necklace.

The tiara came to Sweden with Princess Margaret of Connaught when she married the Swedish prince Gustaf Adolf in 1905. The tiara was made in 1904 by the British court jeweler Garrard & Co and was a wedding gift from the Crown Princess' parents, the Duke and Duchess of Connaught. That it is called Sibylla's diadem is due to the fact that the princess was fond of it and wore it on several occasions. 

Princess Christina wore the tiara as a bridal crown in 1974. This tiara was the first tiara worn by Queen Silvia the night before the 1976 wedding.

Princess Madeleine has worn the tiara as a necklace in the small version with the five brilliant clappers. At her sister's wedding in 2010, she wore it for the first time as a tiara. Likewise, Crown Princess Victoria wore it at the prince's wedding in Denmark in 2008 as a necklace with only the clappers. The queen has worn it as a necklace on one occasion in the 1980s, since then it has only been used as a tiara or in simple form as a necklace.

At Princess Madeleine's wedding in 2013, Princess Birgitta wore the Connaught tiara. 

The clappers used for the simpler necklace can also be worn as earrings, as Princess Madeleine did at Princess Estelle's christening.

Crown Princess Victoria wore the tiara at Prince Carl Philips' wedding in 2015.

Queen Silvia wore Princess Sibylla's tiara at the Nobel Banquet for the first time in 1977.

Baden fringe tiara 
The fringe tiara, made of diamonds, came with Victoria of Baden to Sweden. It was a wedding present from her parents, the Grand Ducal couple of Baden. The princess wore the jewelry as a necklace during the wedding ceremony in her hometown Karlsruhe in 1881. She also wore it as a breast jewelry which was then put in a frame to create the tiara. The design of the jewelry can be traced to the fact that during this time people were fond of the Russian folk costume's headdress kokoshnik, in the jewelry context it came to be called fringe tiara. There are such jewels in several other European royal houses. The tiara consists of 47 rays of diamonds where the middle one is highest and they decrease in height towards each side.

According to Queen Victoria's will, the tiara is to be worn primarily by the country's Crown Princess. Crown Princess Victoria wore the tiara for the first time during the Norwegian Crown Prince Couple's wedding in 2001. Today it is worn primarily by Crown Princess Victoria, but has previously been shared with Princess Lilian. Queen Silvia and Princess Christina have also worn this tiara. Silvia wore it during her state visit to the Vatican City in 1991. In Swedish, the tiara is called "Stråldiademet". At Princess Madeleine's wedding in 2013, Princess Margaretha, Mrs. Ambler wore the Baden fringe tiara. 

Silvia has never worn this tiara at a Nobel banquet. Princess Lilian wore it at her first Nobel Banquet in 1976. The Radiation Diadem is the diadem that most members of the Swedish royal family have worn.

The King Edward VII Ruby Tiara 
In Sweden its called Kronprinsessan Margaretas rubindiadem (Crown Princess Margaret's ruby diadem). Gustav VI Adolf married the British princess Margareta in 1905, and the bride received the ruby tiara as a gift from her uncle and aunt, King Edward VII and Queen Alexandra. The tiara, which can also be turned into a necklace, is made of diamonds and rubies. When Crown Princess Margareta passed away in 1920, the diadem was inherited by her son Prince Sigvard. Sigvard pawned the ruby tiara with his father Gustav VI Adolf, who in turn left it in his will to Sigvard's son Michael. Michael later sold the diadem to his cousin King Carl XVI Gustaf.

During this time, Marianne Bernadotte, Sigvard's wife, has worn the tiara on several occasions, as a necklace at Princess Désirée's wedding in 1964, as a tiara in 1983 during Queen Elisabeth's state visit to Sweden, and at their ruby wedding in 2001. The first time Queen Silvia wore this tiara was in 1995. the prince's wedding in Denmark. Since then, Queen Silvia has used it on a few occasions in recent years.

Queen Silvia's fringe tiara 
The tiara is a fringe tiara which Silvia wore for the first time in the mid-1980s. The jewelry is made of diamonds and is privately owned by the royal family. Queen Silvia's fringe tiara can also be worn as a necklace, which the queen and princesses Madeleine and Victoria have done. This  tiara is the second tiara worn by Madeleine. The first was the aquamarine diadem. Silvia has never used the tiara at the Nobel Banquet, but Princess Madeleine first wore it at the Nobel Banquet in 2002.

Princess Madeleine wore Queen Silvia's ray diadem as a diadem when she married in 2013.

Crown Princess Victoria's 18th birthday tiara 
When Victoria turned 18 she started to wear tiaras at galas. Not much is known about her first tiara, it is said to be a gift from her parents King and Queen of Sweden a small simple tiara made of metallic structure as a base with small spikes of individual diamonds and sapphires. The last time the Crown Princess wore the tiara was at a castle dinner at Stockholm Palace in 2007.

Princess Madeleine's aquamarine tiara 
This tiara is often named as Princess Madeleines tiara but she is not the first to wear it. The tiara has originally belonged to Queen Louise and was worn by the Haga princesses Désirée and Christina in the 1960s. The tiara consists of several small diamonds and a large aquamarine stone and is made in art deco style. Princess Madeleine wore it for the first time and it's her first tiara to wear,  at the Nobel Banquet in 2000. At the 70th anniversary celebration of King Carl XVI Gustaf, it was worn once again by her aunt Princess Christina.

Princess Christina's Tiara 
Princess Christina received it on her 18th birthday from her godmother Elsa Cedergren, daughter of Prince Oscar Bernadotte. The tiara is made of small diamonds and oriental pearls and valued at SEK 350,000. 

On 18 May 2012, the diadem was stolen by a friend of the family who claims that he threw it and the other stolen jewelry from Riksbron in Stockholm. The jewelry has not been found, despite several dives at the bridge.

Princess Birgitta's tiara 
A tiara consisting of pearls and diamonds, Birgitta wore it at the ball before her wedding in 1961. It was created by the jeweler Carman and was a gift from her grandfather, Gustaf VI Adolf. Today, the tiara is owned by the princess daughter, who wore it as a wedding tiara when she got married 1990 and at the Crown Princess' wedding in 2010.

Princess Sibylla's aquamarine tiara 
A tiara first used by Princess Sibylla of Saxe-Coburg and Gotha. Princess Margaretha received the jewelry as a wedding gift in 1964. The tiara is often describes as a kokoshnik inspired jewellery.  In recent years, it has been used by Princess Christina. In 2015, Princess Madeleine wore her aunt's tiara at the Nobel Banquet. The Crown Princess wore the tiara for the first time during the Nobel Banquet 2017.

Queen Louise tiara 
Queen Louise's tiara is an art deco diamond tiara that is today owned by Princess Désirée but was previously worn by Queen Louise when she was crown princess. Louise and later on as the queen of Sweden, all four of her step-granddaughters — Margaretha, Birgitta, Désirée, and Christina wore the tiara.

Princess Sofia's tiara 

A tiara made of diamonds and emeralds, a gift to Princess Sofia from King Carl XVI Gustaf and Queen Silvia for her wedding when she also wore it for the first time. The emerald's can be removed, and Princess Sofia has worn the diadem with no additions such as emeralds. At the Nobel Banquet 2017, pearls were mounted on the diadem that replaced the emeralds. At the Nobel Banquet 2019, the emeralds were instead replaced with turquoises.

Necklaces

Josephine of Leuchtenberg diamondcorsage necklace 
In the past, it was common with decolletage jewelry, so-called corsage. They are usually much larger than brooches. In the Swedish royal family, there is such an old piece of jewelry consisting of diamonds and with 3 diamond clasps, but they could probably be replaced with the pearl clasps with which Josephine of Leuchtenberg is portrayed with. 2 of the clasps can be removed and used as earrings. The corsage can be attached to a diamond necklace and create a necklace.

This old piece of jewelry that Josephine is first portrayed with and then also the queens Lovisa, Sofia, Victoria, Louise. Princess Lilian wore this historic piece of jewelry, but as a necklace. Silvia has also worn it as a necklace on occasions, most recently during the King's dinner for Nobel Laureates at Stockholm Castle in 2009.

Crown Princess Victoria wore the necklace for the first time at her sister's wedding on 8 June 2013.

The version used today as a necklace lacks two diamond claps, these were used as earrings by, among others, Crown Princess Victoria at her daughter Estelle's baptism.

Grand Diamond riviere 
The riviere necklace comes from the Grand Duchess Louise of Baden, mother of Queen Victoria. The necklace consists of 36 diamonds set in gold and silver. A clapper has been added which is much older. The clap was previously owned by Princess Sofia Albertina, sister of Gustav III. The princess bequeathed the clap to the new royal family and Queen Josefina.

The processional jewel 
When Victoria of Baden married in 1881, she had not yet visited Sweden. At the Crown Prince and Crown Princess' arrival in Stockholm, Sweden's new Crown Princess received a gift from her new husband; a necklace made of diamonds, 16 Ceylon sapphires, 6 sapphires and 25 baroque pearls. It has later come to be called The processional jewel in Swedish named Intågningssmycke. The necklace has been worn by several members of the royal family.

13 row pearl and diamond choker 
When Victoria of Baden, then the Crown Princess, celebrated her silver wedding in 1906 with her husband Gustav V, she received a 13-row pearl necklace that was modern at that time from her parents-in-law. The necklace is designed to fit snugly around the neck and includes 13 rows of oriental pearls and 5 diamond rods. This type of collar is also usually called a dog collar ("collier de chien").

Princess Christina wore it on occasions when she was Sweden's "first lady" 1972-1974, Silvia has worn it on a few occasions. The latest of the royal ladies to wear the necklace is Princess Madeleine.

Scarab Necklace 
The necklace was a wedding gift from Gustav V and his wife Victoria of Baden to their future daughter-in-law, Margaret of Connaught. The necklace consists of rubies, sapphires, diamonds and pearls in a kind of "Egyptian style", with scarabs. Princess Margareta and Gustaf VI Adolf met in Cairo. The jewelry was created by the jeweler Koch in Frankfurt am Main in 1905. Prince Bertil inherited the necklace from his mother and it was worn on several occasions by Princess Lilian. The necklace was bequeathed to Queen Silvia from Princess Lilian.

Earrings

Karl XIV Johan earrings 
The earrings from Karl XIV Johan's jewelry fideicommiss consist of a large drop of brilliant which is surrounded by a smaller wreath of diamonds and another larger one with large diamonds. The first queen to wear these was Queen Lovisa, married to Karl XV. They are still used today by Queen Silvia.

Vasa earrings 
A pair of brilliant earrings that have the shape of a teardrop-shaped wreath with a pendant shaped like a globe with a brilliant mount. They are among the oldest jewel in the jewelry collection dating back to the end of the 18th century. They probably come from Gustav IV Adolf's wife Fredrika of Baden. When the couple was exiled in 1809, they took with them some jewelry that was then inherited by their eldest son Gustaf and later by his daughter Carola who was married to King Albert of Saxony.

When Victoria of Baden married Gustaf in 1881, she received the earrings as a wedding gift from Queen Carola. 

The earrings can be worn without the pendant, so that the wreath is empty. Today they are worn by Queen Silvia, Crown Princess Victoria and Princess Madeleine.

Princess Madeleine wore the Vasa earrings when she got married in 2013.

Epaulette Earrings 
These earrings were worn by Crown Princess Victoria at the concert before the wedding on 18 June 2010. Epaulet means shoulder jewelry and is part of certain uniforms. The name Epålett (Epaulette earrings) earrings was first published on 11 December 2011, when Victoria wore them for the second time. At King Carl XVI Gustaf's 70th birthday, Princess Madeleine wore the earrings.

Brooches

Josephine of Leuchtenberg diamond, ruby and pearl brooch 
One of the oldest picture-documented brooches is one worn by Josephine of Leuchtenberg. It is a flower brooch, consisting of diamonds, rubies and pearls. It is used as both a brooch and hair ornament by Crown Princess Victoria and Queen Silvia. Crown Princess Victoria has worn it as an alternative to a classic tiara at Queen Margaret's 70th birthday party in Copenhagen in 2010 and at the King's dinner for the 2010 Nobel Laureates at Stockholm Castle.

Diamond Arrow 
This diamond arrow broosch has only been worn by Queen Silvia on a few occasions. On 18 June 2010, the night before the wedding between Crown Princess Victoria and Prince Daniel, Crown Princess Victoria wore this brooch as a hair ornament. The oldest pictorial listing of the jewelry is as late as 1953, when it was worn by Princess Sibylla during the Nobel ceremony, but it is probably older than that.

Princess Lilians diamond broosch 
Lilian's diamond brooch is a small brooch made of diamonds shaped like a flower, which Crown Princess Victoria received as a gift from Princess Lilian. Victoria wore the brooch at the media meeting in connection with her engagement. During the Turkish state visit the day after Princess Lilian died, Victoria wore the brooch at lunch and the gala dinner in the evening.

Victoria of Baden coursage broosch 
This large round brooch has been worn by Queen Victoria as a corsage piece. It has not been documented since Victoria of Baden. The jewelry was worn for the first time by Queen Silvia during the state visit to Germany in 2016. No other known royal have worn this item.

See also 
Jewels of Elizabeth II

Jewels of Diana, Princess of Wales

Tiaras of the Spanish Royal Family

Print sources 
 Bond, Cay; Alm Göran (2006). (in Swedish) Drottning Silvias festklänningar och de kungliga smyckena. Stockholm: Atlantis. Libris 10154529. ISBN 91-7353-130-8 (inb.)
 Alm, Göran; Fogelmarck Stig, Granslund Lis (1976). (in Swedish) Smycken för drottningar tillhöriga de Bernadotteska stiftelserna: Stockholms slott 1976-1977. Stockholm: Ståthållarämbetet. Libris 3277116
 Steen Jensen, Bjarne (2002) (in Danish). Juvelerne i det danske kongehus. Köpenhamn: Nyt Nordisk forlag Arnold Busck. ISBN 8717071437(inb.)

Documentaries 
 Kungliga smycken - Symboler för makt och kärlek (In Swedish) Aired 2020 on SVT (2 parts)
 De Kongelige Juveler (In Danish and English) Aired 2011 on DR (2 parts)

External links 
 Official website of the royal house of Denmark
 Official website of the royal house of Norway 
 Official web site of the royal house of Sweden 
 Official website of the royal house of Sweden Category: pressphotos 
 Royal Magazin

Swedish royalty
Material culture of royal courts
Jewellery